Benjamin Aaron Alman is an American orthopaedic clinician-scientist and currently Chair of Orthopaedic Surgery at Duke University School of Medicine (Durham, North Carolina).  Alman is the Distinguished James R. Urbaniak, MD, Professor of Orthopaedic Surgery and also holds appointments with the Department of Cell Biology, Pediatrics, and Pathology at Duke University. Among Alman's other appointments, he is co-director of the Regeneration Next Initiative at Duke University.

Previous appointments 
Prior to Duke, Alman was the A. J. Latner professor and Head of the division of Orthopedic surgery at the Hospital for Sick Children in Toronto, Ontario, senior scientist in developmental and stem cell biology at Sick Kids, and vice chair of the department of surgery at the University of Toronto.

Research 
Alman's research specialty is  the  pathology of  the musculoskeletal system.

Awards 
Alman has received the Premier's Research Excellence Award, the Huene Award, the OREF Research Award, and the Royal College Medal in Surgery.

References

External links
 Alman's lab

Canadian orthopedic surgeons
Academic staff of the University of Toronto
Year of birth missing (living people)
Living people